Steinar Kjetil Johansen (born 27 February 1972) is a Norwegian speed skater. He was born in Holmestrand. He competed at the 1992 Winter Olympics in Albertville, at the 1994 Winter Olympics in Lillehammer,  and at the 1998 Winter Olympics in Nagano.

References

External links 
 

1972 births
Living people
People from Holmestrand
Norwegian male speed skaters
Olympic speed skaters of Norway
Speed skaters at the 1992 Winter Olympics
Speed skaters at the 1994 Winter Olympics
Speed skaters at the 1998 Winter Olympics
Sportspeople from Vestfold og Telemark
20th-century Norwegian people